Seymour is a rural locality in the local government area (LGA) of Break O'Day in the North-east LGA region of Tasmania. The 2016 census recorded a population of 25 for the state suburb of Seymour.

History 
Seymour was gazetted as a locality in 1965. The name was in use by 1845. 

It was originally a coal mining town.

Geography
The waters of the Tasman Sea form the eastern boundary.

Road infrastructure 
Route A3 (Tasman Highway) passes through from south to north.

References

Towns in Tasmania
Localities of Break O'Day Council